The Roosevelts: An Intimate History is a 2014 American documentary television miniseries directed and produced by Ken Burns. It covers the lives and times of the three most prominent members of the  Roosevelt family, Theodore Roosevelt, a Republican and the 26th President of the United States; Franklin D. Roosevelt, a Democrat, the 32nd President of the United States, and fifth cousin of Theodore; and Eleanor Roosevelt, the longest-serving First Lady of the United States, a niece of Theodore, and wife of Franklin. As a result of the influence of Theodore and Franklin as Presidents, as well as Eleanor as First Lady, a modern democratic state of equal opportunity was begun in the United States. The series begins with the birth of Theodore in 1858 and ends with the death of Eleanor in 1962.

Actors and historians
The series is narrated by Peter Coyote. Actors read lines of various historical figures and a series of noted commentators give background information. They include:

 Paul Giamatti - Theodore Roosevelt (voice)
 Edward Herrmann - Franklin D. Roosevelt (voice)
 Meryl Streep - Eleanor Roosevelt (voice)
 John Lithgow - James Roosevelt I (voice)
 Patricia Clarkson - Margaret "Daisy" Suckley (voice)

As themselves: 
 Jonathan Alter
 H. W. Brands
 Blanche Wiesen Cook
 Doris Kearns Goodwin
 Edna Gurewitsch
 Clay S. Jenkinson
 William Leuchtenburg
 David McCullough
 Jon Meacham
 Patricia O'Toole
 Geoffrey C. Ward
 George Will

Other voices include: Adam Arkin, Keith Carradine, Kevin Conway, Ed Harris, Josh Lucas, Carl Lumbly, Amy Madigan, Carolyn McCormick, Pamela Reed, Billy Bob Thornton, and Eli Wallach.

Episodes

Critical response
The series premiered to positive reviews and was nominated for three Primetime Emmy Awards, winning the Emmy Award for Outstanding Narrator for Peter Coyote's narration of the first episode. In September 2014, The Roosevelts became the most streamed documentary on the PBS website to date.

According to critic James Poniewozik of Time magazine, "The Roosevelts tells the story of the American 20th century in triptych. Teddy (who became President in 1901) is progressivism, expansionism and reform. FDR is the rise of American power and the rewriting of the social contract. (Conservative pundit George Will sums up his legacy: the government would not just 'provide the conditions for the pursuit of happiness' but 'deliver happiness, understood as material well-being.') Eleanor looks ahead to postwar globalism and the move of women and minorities in from the margins." Further, Poniewozik states, "The Roosevelts brings up a kind of nature-nurture question: did these leaders make the times, or did the times make these leaders? It can't answer this question. But it does manage to tell an educational, emotional story of how these leaders and their times made us."

Hank Stuever, critic at The Washington Post, writes, "Let's start with the end. When it's over — when you make it through the marathon that is Ken Burns's beautiful, seven-part documentary The Roosevelts: An Intimate History, ... you may find yourself with a lingering, nebulous grief. You're sorry it's over. You're sorry they're over. You're sorry a certain expression of American ideals is, or often appears to be, completely over."

Timothy Egan of The New York Times wrote, "Ambitious and deeply moving."

See also 

 List of women's rights activists
 Political positions of Theodore Roosevelt
 The Roosevelt Story - 1947 documentary
 Sunrise at Campobello - 1960 film
 The Eleanor Roosevelt Story - 1965 biographical documentary film
 Eleanor and Franklin - 1976 TV miniseries 
 Eleanor and Franklin: The White House Years - 1977 TV movie
 Rough Riders - 1997 TV miniseries
 Warm Springs - 2005 TV film
 Theodore Roosevelt Birthplace National Historic Site
 Theodore Roosevelt Inaugural National Historic Site

References

External links
  at the PBS WebSite/1.
  at the PBS WebSite/2.
 The Roosevelts at the Ken Burns WebSite.
 .
 The Roosevelts - Episodes: PBS; TV; VOX. 
 .
 The Roosevelts – video search on YouTube.
 The Roosevelts – video search on Dailymotion.

2010s American documentary television series
Films about Franklin D. Roosevelt
Cultural depictions of Theodore Roosevelt
Roosevelt family
Eleanor Roosevelt
Television series about presidents of the United States